Ana Carla Carvalho (born February 14, 1991, in Guarapuava) is a Brazilian swimmer.

References

Brazilian female breaststroke swimmers
Living people
1991 births
Sportspeople from Belo Horizonte
20th-century Brazilian women
21st-century Brazilian women